Hadrothemis versuta is a species of dragonfly in the family Libellulidae. It is found in Cameroon, Central African Republic, the Republic of the Congo, the Democratic Republic of the Congo, Ivory Coast, Equatorial Guinea, Gabon, Guinea, Liberia, Nigeria, Uganda, and Zambia. Its natural habitats are subtropical or tropical moist lowland forests and intermittent freshwater marshes.

References

Libellulidae
Taxonomy articles created by Polbot
Insects described in 1891